Francisco Parra Capó (20 December 1871 – ca. 1945) was a Puerto Rican attorney, politician, and Mayor of Ponce, Puerto Rico, from 1921 to 1923.

Early years
Francisco Parra Capó was born in Ponce in 1867, the son of Francisco Parra Duperón and Eufemia Constanza Capó Ortiz de la Renta Bermudas.

Professional life
In 1900 he was elected to the Puerto Rico House of Delegates for the district of Ponce and served until the end of his term in 1902.

In 1919, he worked as the Archivero General (Archivist-in-Chief) for the Ponce District. He became an attorney and joined his father's law firm in Ponce. The law firm, known as Parra, del Valle & Limeres, operated until 2016 from the Banco de Ponce Building. At the time of its closing, it was the oldest law firm in Puerto Rico. As an attorney, Parra Capó subsequently worked as a military aid to governor Blanton Winship in the mid to late 1930s with his nephew Francisco Parra Toro.

Parra Capó was president of the Ponce Municipal Assembly when the Ponce massacre took place on March 21, 1937.

See also

 Ponce, Puerto Rico
 List of Puerto Ricans

Notes

References

Further reading
 Fay Fowlie de Flores. Ponce, Perla del Sur: Una Bibliográfica Anotada. Second Edition. 1997. Ponce, Puerto Rico: Universidad de Puerto Rico en Ponce. p. 216. Item 1109. 
 Cayetano Coll y Toste. Boletín Histórico de Puerto Rico. San Juan, Puerto Rico: Cantera Fernandez. 1914–1927. (Colegio Universitario Tecnológico de Ponce, CUTPO).
 Fay Fowlie de Flores. Ponce, Perla del Sur: Una Bibliográfica Anotada. Second Edition. 1997. Ponce, Puerto Rico: Universidad de Puerto Rico en Ponce. p. 109. Item 560. 
 The Representative Men of Puerto Rico. Compiled and edited by F.E. Jackson & Son. C. Frederiksen, artist and photographer. s.l.: F.E. Jackson & Son. 1901. (PUCPR; Universidad Puerto Rico - Rio Piedras, UPR).
 Fay Fowlie de Flores. Ponce, Perla del Sur: Una Bibliográfica Anotada. Second Edition. 1997. Ponce, Puerto Rico: Universidad de Puerto Rico en Ponce. p. 116. Item 589. 
 Felix Bernier Matos. Cromos ponceños. (por Fray Justo) Ponce, Puerto Rico: Imprenta "La Libertad." 1896. (Colegio Universitario Tecnológico de Ponce, CUTPO)
 Fay Fowlie de Flores. Ponce, Perla del Sur: Una Bibliografía Anotada. Second Edition. 1997. Ponce, Puerto Rico: Universidad de Puerto Rico en Ponce. p. 338. Item 1684. 
 Jose Joaquin Rodriguez. "Partido Socialista y el Ligao de Ponce." Punto y Coma. Año 2 (1990) pp. 21–24. (Colegio Universitario Tecnológico de Ponce, CUTPO)

1867 births
Puerto Rican lawyers
Mayors of Ponce, Puerto Rico
Republican Party (Puerto Rico) politicians
Attorneys from Ponce
Year of death missing